Evgeny Georgievich Popov (born September 11, 1978, Vladivostok) is a Russian politician, journalist and a deputy of the 8th State Duma.

Career
After graduating from the university, Popov started working as a correspondent of the Vesti TV program in Vladivostok. In 2002 he moved to Moscow and in 2003-2006 was in Ukraine, covering news for Russia-1. He came back to Moscow in 2006 to become a political commentator of the TV program "Vesti nedeli". From 2008 to 2013, Popov headed the "Vesti" program in New York. 

In 2016, Popov, and his wife, Olga Skabeyeva, launched a TV show titled "60 minut" on Russia-1. Since September 2021, Popov has served as deputy of the 8th State Duma from the Moscow constituency.

Popov covered the revolutions of 2004-2005 and 2013-2014 in Ukraine. Later Popov created a series of documentaries in which he used fake documents to discredit Alexey Navalny. In 2014, Security Service of Ukraine declared Evgeny Popov persona non grata. 

In 2020, The Insider ranked Popov and Skabeyeva 7th and 8th out of 12 wealthiest Russian propagandists.

In 2021, the Anti-Corruption Foundation released the proof that Popov and Skabeyeva own property in Moscow, the overall cost of which is around 300 million rubles.

Personal life
Evgeny Popov is married to Olga Skabeyeva both of them are well-known for their criticism of the Russian opposition. Skabeyeva even has the nickname "iron doll of Putin TV".

References

External links

1978 births
Living people
Russian propagandists
United Russia politicians
21st-century Russian politicians
Eighth convocation members of the State Duma (Russian Federation)
Russian journalists
Far Eastern Federal University alumni
Mass media people from Vladivostok
Politicians from Vladivostok